Jocelyne Saucier (born May 27, 1948 in Clair, New Brunswick) is a Canadian novelist and journalist based in Quebec.

Career
Educated in political science at the Université Laval, Saucier worked as a journalist in the Abitibi-Témiscamingue region of Quebec before publishing her debut novel, La Vie comme une image, in 1996. That book was a finalist for the Governor General's Award for French-language fiction at the 1996 Governor General's Awards. Her second novel, Les Héritiers de la mine, was a finalist for the Prix France-Québec in 2001, and her third novel, Jeanne sur les routes, was a finalist at the 2006 Governor General's Awards. Her fourth novel, Il pleuvait des oiseaux, won the Prix France-Québec, the Prix Ringuet, the Prix des cinq continents de la francophonie, the Prix des lecteurs de Radio-Canada and the Prix littéraire des collégiens, while And the Birds Rained Down, its English translation by Rhonda Mullins, was a finalist for the Governor General's Award for French to English translation at the 2013 Governor General's Awards.

Il pleuvait des oiseaux was selected for the 2013 edition of Le Combat des livres, where it was championed by dancer and broadcaster Geneviève Guérard. And the Birds Rained Down was defended by Martha Wainwright in the 2015 edition of Canada Reads.

A film adaptation of Il pleuvait des oiseaux by director Louise Archambault was released to theatres in 2019.

Works
 La Vie comme une image (1996)
 English translation House of Sighs (2001)
 Les Héritiers de la mine (2000)
 English translation Twenty-One Cardinals (2015)
 Jeanne sur les routes (2006)
 English translation Jeanne's Road (2010)
 Il pleuvait des oiseaux. XYZ, Montréal 2011, ; Gallimard, Paris 2015 
 English translation And the Birds Rained Down by Rhonda Mullins. Coach House, Toronto 2012 ; Coach House, London 2015 
À train perdu (2020)
 English translation And Miles To Go Before I Sleep (2022)

References

1948 births
20th-century Canadian novelists
21st-century Canadian novelists
Canadian novelists in French
Canadian women novelists
Writers from Quebec
Writers from New Brunswick
Université Laval alumni
People from Madawaska County, New Brunswick
People from Abitibi-Témiscamingue
Living people
Canadian women journalists
20th-century Canadian women writers
21st-century Canadian women writers
Canadian women non-fiction writers